The Great Eight:  How to Be Happy (even when you have every reason to be miserable) is a self-help book written by Olympian figure skater Scott Hamilton.

Summary
Gold Medal Olympian and Hall of Fame figure skater, Scott Hamilton has overcome multiple life-threatening challenges and disappointments in his life.  In this autobiographical book, Hamilton uses stories from his life to illustrate the principles that have shaped his life.

Hamilton lists eight principles that he states will help readers live happier lives:
  Fall, Get Up, and Land Your First Jumps
  Trust Your Almighty Coach
  Make Your Losses Your Wins
  Keep the Ice Clear
  Think Positive, Laugh, and Smile Like Kristi Yamaguchi
  Win by Going Last
  Learn a New Routine
  Stand in the Spotlight

External links
Author Interview in Washington Post
Author Interview in TV Guide

Self-help books
2009 non-fiction books